The 2017–18 Regional One Day Cup was a List A cricket tournament that took place in Pakistan. The competition ran from 24 January to 11 February 2018. Peshawar were the defending champions.

In round seven of the tournament, Abid Ali, batting for Islamabad, scored 209 not out against Peshawar. This was the highest List A score by a Pakistan batsman and he became the fourth batsman from Pakistan to score 200 runs or more in a List A match.

Following the group stage, Karachi Whites and Peshawar advanced to the first semi-final, with Rawalpindi and Islamabad progressing to the second semi-final. In the first semi-final, Karachi Whites beat Peshawar, the defending champions, by five wickets to move to the final. In the second semi-final, Islamabad beat Rawalpindi by 13 runs to progress to the final. Karachi Whites won the tournament, beating Islamabad by five wickets in the final.

Teams
The following teams are competing:

 Faisalabad
 Federally Administered Tribal Areas
 Islamabad
 Karachi Whites
 Lahore Blues
 Lahore Whites
 Peshawar
 Rawalpindi

Points table

 Teams qualified for the finals

Fixtures

Round 1

Round 2

Round 3

Round 4

Round 5

Round 6

Round 7

Finals

References

External links
 Series home at ESPN Cricinfo

2018 in Pakistani cricket
Domestic cricket competitions in 2017–18
2017–18 Regional One Day Cup